A bronze statue of Sandy Koufax was installed outside Dodger Stadium in 2022. Koufax was a pitcher for both the Brooklyn and Los Angeles Dodgers from 1955 to 1966.

References

2022 establishments in California
2022 sculptures
Bronze sculptures in California
Monuments and memorials in Los Angeles
Outdoor sculptures in Greater Los Angeles
Sculptures of men in California
Statues in California